Southern California Amateur Hockey Association is the governing body for competitive and developmental youth hockey on Southern California and is sanctioned by the California Amateur Hockey Association as part of USA Hockey.

Known by the acronym SCAHA, the association was formed in 1974 and officially lists 22 member hockey clubs. SCAHA is the largest youth hockey league in the Western United States.

SCAHA Leadership
SCAHA Executive Committee:
 Sandy Blumberg, Commissioner
 John Siberstein, Deputy Commissioner
 Jaime Campbell, Director of Manager
 Kevin Culbertson, Director at Large
 Bob Driffill, Treasurer
 Nancy Hodge, Ace Coaching Coordinator
 Rosemary Voulelikas, Secretary

SCAHA Staff:
 Chris Carcerano, Ice Convener
 Annie Fisher, Statistician
 Wendy Goldstein, Director of Member Services

2009–2010 season
For the 2009–2010 season, 22 clubs are participating in competition ranging from the Mite through Midget levels.

A total of 156 teams are competing under to auspices of SCAHA — with 37 at the tier level and another 119 at the developmental travel level. There are seven exhibition teams, five for the Lady Ducks and two Select Girls teams.

The teams compete in one of the following playing levels: Mite, Squirt B, Squirt A, PeeWee B, PeeWee A, PeeWee AA, Bantam B, Bantam A, Bantam AA, Midget 16U A, Midget 16U AA, Midget 18U A, Midget 18U AA.

2018–2019 season
Since the 2009–2010 season, there has been minimal change in Southern California Hockey up until the latest season. Most of the teams from the list below remain in some form still active. With edits to playing rules that have heavily opposed the ones of the Northern California Amateur Hockey Association, SOCAL has had a predominant role in youth California hockey. Some of the changes that have happened in the playing rules and league changes have been caused by the parent organization CAHA (California Amateur Hockey Association) and their parent organization USA Hockey. Most of rule changes since 2010 have involved a further emphasis on cross ice (using only one zone of the three on the ice to play a game of hockey, this is used mostly in the younger age groups) games for the Mite divisions. Also, there have been further divisions made in how they manage players of different skill levels. In 2010, they had some clubs and age groups that would have the AA division as their highest level of hockey. Some clubs, as of this moment only the Jr. Ducks and Jr. Kings, have included the international AAA division for players who are taking a more serious approach to hockey and are aiming at professional play. However, since only two clubs offer this division AAA travel internationally to play other teams and do not compete at the local level. More it terms of being local, the AA division is offered by a handful of clubs in SOCAL and although they also compete internationally, they do it far less than the AAA teams. Instead, they compete at the statewide level against other SOCAL AA teams as well as AA teams from NORCAL (Northern California Amateur Hockey Association). The A and B divisions used to be the only local divisions, in which SOCAL teams only against each other and the same for NORCAL teams. Now, there has been a new division added; BB, which is intended to serve as an intermediary for teams unskilled enough in the A division but are overly skilled for the B divisions. All three of them play weekly local games in their respected division, but the top two teams from NORCAL and top two teams from SOCAL will face off in the CAHA state championships, the only non localized games in these divisions that go on during the season. All of the listed hockey divisions go on tournaments, in which they travel to another location to play teams from other states and occasionally other countries. The prime example of a tournament of teams from different US States and Canadian Provinces is the International Silver Stick. Often, multi rink facilities or separate rinks will host tournaments as well. The most common SOCAL hosted tournaments are located in Riverside, Los Angeles, Anaheim, San Diego, and Valencia. Since these tournaments are either meant for AA or AAA teams, for them it is a part of their regular season. For the A, BB, and B teams, these tournaments are an entirely different form of competition so they usually temporarily merge into the SOCAL league.

Participating clubs
 Anaheim Jr. Ducks
 Bakersfield Condors
 Bay Harbor Red Wings
 California Golden Bears
California Heat
 California Wave
California Jr Reign
Goldrush Hockey Club

 Los Angeles Jr. Kings
 OC Hockey Club
 Ontario Moose
 Pasadena Maple Leafs
 San Diego Jr. Gulls
 San Diego Ice Arena Hockey Club
 San Diego Saints
 Ventura Mariners

Participating Rinks
The list of rinks are as of August 2022.
 Aliso Viejo Ice Palace
 Bakersfield Ice Sports Center
 Carlsbad Ice Center
 East West Ice Palace
 Great Park Ice & Fivepoint Arena
 Ice in Paradise
 Ice Town Riverside
 Iceoplex - Simi Valley
 KHS ICE
 Kroc Center Ice Arena
 LA Kings Valley Ice Center
 Lake Forest Ice Palace
 Mechanics Bank Arena
 Ontario Center Ice Arena
 Ontario Ice Skating Center
 Paramount Iceland
 Pasadena Skating Center
 Pickwick Ice Arena
 Poway Ice Arena
 San Diego Ice Arena
 Skating Edge Ice Center
 The Cube Santa Clarita
 The Rinks: Anaheim ICE
 The Rinks: Lakewood ICE
 The Rinks: Westminster ICE
 The Rinks: Yorba Linda ICE
 Toyota Arena
 Toyota Sports Performance Center
 UTC La Jolla

References

External links
 Southern California Amateur Hockey Association
 SCAHA InfoCenter 2010 iPhone Application
 SCAHA Master schedule
 Current SCAHA standings
 California Amateur Hockey Association
 USA Hockey
 Southern California Hockey Forums

Junior ice hockey governing bodies in the United States
Ice hockey in California
Organizations established in 1974